Freeman House, also known as The Stateline House, is a historic home located on the North Carolina-Virginia state line near Gates, Gates County, North Carolina, USA. The house was built in three building phases, the earliest perhaps dating to the late-18th century.  The farmhouse was initially built following the basic early-Federal-style one-room plan, followed by the addition of a late-Federal-style two-story side-hall-plan, which was finally enlarged and converted in the mid-19th century to a more substantial Greek Revival style, center-hall-plan dwelling. The main section is a two-story, five bay, frame structure. Also on the property are the contributing smokehouse, a kitchen with exterior end chimney, a one-story tack house with an attached wood shed, a small, unidentified shed, two large barns, and a stable.

It was listed on the National Register of Historic Places in 1982.

References

Houses on the National Register of Historic Places in North Carolina
Houses on the National Register of Historic Places in Virginia
Federal architecture in North Carolina
Federal architecture in Virginia
Greek Revival houses in North Carolina
Greek Revival houses in Virginia
Houses in Gates County, North Carolina
Houses in Suffolk, Virginia
National Register of Historic Places in Gates County, North Carolina
National Register of Historic Places in Suffolk, Virginia
U.S. Route 13
Borders of North Carolina
Borders of Virginia